Clematochaeta perpallida is a species of tephritid or fruit flies in the genus Clematochaeta of the family Tephritidae.

Distribution
Malawi, Zimbabwe.

References

Tephritinae
Insects described in 1918
Taxa named by Mario Bezzi
Diptera of Africa